Endy Semeleer (born 18 November 1995) is a Dutch kickboxer who competes in the welterweight division of Glory, where he is the reigning welterweight champion. Semeleer is the former three-weight Enfusion champion, having held titles at -77kg, -75kg and -72.5kg.

He is ranked as the fifth best welterweight in the world by Combat Press as of September 2022, and the fourth best by Beyond Kick as of October 2022. Semeleer has been continually ranked in the Combat Press top ten since January 2018.

Kickboxing career

Early career
In 2016 Endy participated in an eight man King of the Ring tournament. Following a flying knee win over Nicky Lopez and a TKO win over Marcel Verhaar, Semeleer faced Robert Siebenheller in the final match of the tournament. He won the fight by a first round knockout.

Enfusion

Abu Dhabi Tournament
The following year, he was signed with Enfusion. He achieved a four fight winning streak with the organization, with decision wins over Bilal Loukili and Regilio van den Ent, as well as KO wins over Hamed Nabil and Jordan Watson. This earned him a spot in the Enfusion Eight Man Tournament. In the quarter final bout he scored a third round TKO win over Diogo Calado, and in the semi finals a decision win over Mohamed Khamal. In the finals of the tournament, Endy faced the kickboxing and muay thai legend Superbon Banchamek. Semeleer won the fight by a unanimous decision, winning the tournament and €100 000 in prize money. Combat Press gave this fight their "Upset of the Year" award.

Enfusion 75kg Champion
Semeleer faced Enfusion Aziz Kallah for the vacant 75 kg World title at Enfusion 73 on October 27, 2018. He won the title by unanimous decision. 

Two months later, Semeleer participated in the Enfusion -72.5 kg tournament, which was held at Enfusion Live 76 on December 7, 2018. Although he won the quarterfinal bout against Marouan Toutouh by unanimous decision, he forced to withdraw due to an injury he suffered during the bout.

Semeleer attempted to become a two weight world champion when he challenged the reigning 72.5 kg champion Tayfun Özcan at Enfusion Live 79 on February 23, 2019. Semeleer suffered the first loss of his professional career, dropping a decision to the Dutch-Turkish fighter.

Semeleer made his first -75 kg title defense against Marouan Toutouh at Enfusion 85 on June 8, 2019. He won the fight by unanimous decision.

Semeleer faced Davide Armanini in a non-title bout at Enfusion 89 on October 26, 2019. He won the fight by a third-round technical knockout.

Double champion
Semeleer once again attempted to capture the 72.5 kg World title at Enfusion 98 on October 3, 2019, as he was booked to face Nordin van Roosmalen. Endy scored an early knockdown in the first round, landing a knee to Nordin's head. He dominated the remaining four rounds as well, and won the fight by a unanimous decision.

Semeleer was booked to face the two-time Dutch kickboxing champion Kevin Hessling on September 11, 2021, at the Enfusion's Nijmegen event. He won the fight by a first-round knockout.

Semeleer was scheduled to face Jay Overmeer for the inaugural Enfusion World Welterweight (-77kg) Championship at Enfusion #104 on November 12, 2021. He won the fight by unanimous decision.

Glory
On April 21, 2022, it was announced that Semeleer had signed with Glory. Semeleer was expected to make his debut against Harut Grigorian at Glory Rivals 1 on May 21, 2022. The event was later postponed, as The Lotto Arena announced that their cooperation with the Antwerp Fight Organisation had been terminated due to various administrative reasons.

Semeleer was expected to face Robin Ciric in the main event of Glory Rivals 2 on July 25, 2022. Ciric withdrew from the fight in August 29, after contracting COVID-19, and was replaced by Shkodran Veseli. Semeleer won the fight by third-round knockout.

Welterweight champion
Semeleer faced the second-ranked Glory welterweight contender Alim Nabiev for the vacant Glory Welterweight Championship at Glory 82 on November 19, 2022. He won the fight by split decision, with three judges scoring the bout 48–47 in his favor, while the remaining two judges scored it 49–46 and 48–47 for Nabiev.

Semeleer made his first welterweight title defense against Murthel Groenhart at Glory 85 on April 29, 2023.

Championships and accomplishments 
Enfusion
2017 Enfusion Abu Dhabi: 8-Man Tournament Winner
2018 Enfusion 75 kg World Champion (1 Defense)
2020 Enfusion 72.5 kg World Champion
2021 Enfusion 77 kg World Champion
King of the Ring
2016 King of the Ring 8-Man Tournament Winner
Combat Press
2017 Upset of the Year Award 
Glory
2022 Glory Welterweight (-77 kg) Champion

Kickboxing record

|-  style="background:#;"
| 2023-04-29 ||  ||align=left| Murthel Groenhart || Glory 85 ||  ||  || ||  
|-
! style=background:white colspan=9 |
|-  style="background:#cfc;"
| 2022-11-19 || Win ||align=left| Alim Nabiev || Glory 82 || Bonn, Germany || Decision (Split) || 5 || 3:00 
|-
! style=background:white colspan=9 |
|-  bgcolor="#cfc"
| 2022-09-17 || Win ||align=left| Shkodran Veseli || Glory Rivals 2 ||  Alkmaar, Netherlands || KO (Right hook) || 3 || 1:05  
|-
|-  bgcolor="#cfc"
| 2021-11-12 || Win  ||align=left| Jay Overmeer || Enfusion #104 ||  Abu Dhabi, United Arab Emirates || Decision (Unanimous)  || 5 || 3:00 
|-
! style=background:white colspan=9 |
|-
|-  bgcolor="#cfc"
| 2021-09-05 || Win ||align=left| Kevin Hessling || Enfusion #102 ||  Alkmaar, Netherlands  || KO (Left hook) || 1 || 1:05
|-  bgcolor="#cfc"
| 2020-10-03 || Win ||align=left| Nordin van Roosmalen || Enfusion #98 ||  Alkmaar, Netherlands || Decision (Unanimous)  ||5  ||3:00 
|-
! style=background:white colspan=9 |
|-
|-  bgcolor="#CCFFCC"
| 2019-10-26 || Win ||align=left| Davide Armanini || Enfusion #89 ||  Wuppertal, Germany|| TKO (Punches) || 3 ||
|-  bgcolor="#CCFFCC"
| 2019-06-08 || Win ||align=left| Marouan Toutouh || Enfusion #85 ||  Groningen, Netherlands || Decision (Unanimous) || 5 || 3:00 
|-
! style=background:white colspan=9 |
|-
|-  style="background:#fbb;"
| 2019-02-23 || Loss||align=left| Tayfun Özcan|| Enfusion Live 79|| Eindhoven, Netherlands || Decision || 5 || 3:00
|-
! style=background:white colspan=9 |
|-
|-  bgcolor="#CCFFCC"
| 2018-12-07 || Win ||align=left| Marouan Toutouh || Enfusion Live 76 - 72.5kg 8 Man Tournament, Quarter Finals ||  Abu Dhabi, United Arab Emirates || Decision (Unanimous) || 3 || 3:00 
|-
! style=background:white colspan=9 |
|-
|- align="center"  bgcolor="#CCFFCC"
| 2018-10-27 || Win ||align=left| Aziz Kallah || Enfusion 73 ||  Oberhausen, Germany  || Decision (Unanimous) || 5 || 3:00
|-
! style=background:white colspan=9 |
|-
|-  bgcolor="#CCFFCC"
| 2018-06-23 || Win ||align=left| Paul Jensen || Enfusion 69  ||  Netherlands  || TKO (Doctor Stoppage/Cut) || 2 || 0:52
|-  bgcolor="#CCFFCC"
| 2018-05-12 || Win ||align=left| Nordin Ben-Moh || Enfusion 67  || The Hague, Netherlands  || Decision (Unanimous) || 3 || 3:00
|-  bgcolor="#CCFFCC"
| 2018-03-09 || Win ||align=left| Redouan Laarkoubi || Enfusion Live  || Abu Dhabi, UAE  || Decision (Unanimous) || 3 || 3:00
|-  bgcolor="#CCFFCC"
| 2017-12-08 || Win ||align=left| Superbon Banchamek || Enfusion Live 59: Final || Abu Dhabi, UAE  || Decision (Unanimous) || 3 || 3:00
|-
! style=background:white colspan=9 |
|-
|-  bgcolor="#CCFFCC"
| 2017-12-08 || Win ||align=left| Mohamed Khamal || Enfusion Live 59: Semi Finals || Abu Dhabi, UAE  || Decision (Unanimous) || 3 || 3:00
|-
|-  bgcolor="#CCFFCC"
| 2017-12-08 || Win ||align=left| Diogo Calado || Enfusion Live 59: Quarter Finals || Abu Dhabi, UAE  || TKO  || 3 || 3:00
|-
|-  bgcolor="#CCFFCC"
| 2017-11-11 || Win ||align=left| Jordan Watson || Enfusion Live 55  Final 16|| Amsterdam, Netherlands || TKO  || 4 ||
|-
|-  bgcolor="#CCFFCC"
| 2017-09-16 || Win ||align=left| Regilio van den Ent || Enfusion Live 52 || Zwolle, Netherlands || Decision (Unanimous)  || 3 ||
|-
|-  bgcolor="#CCFFCC"
| 2017-05-06 || Win ||align=left| Martin Hiffens || Battle Events || Amersfoort, Netherlands || KO (Stoppage Time)  || 3 ||
|-
|-  bgcolor="#CCFFCC"
| 2017-03-24 || Win ||align=left| Hamed Nabil  || Enfusion Live 48  || Abu Dhabi, UAE || TKO (Surrender)  || 1 ||
|-
|- style="background:#CCFFCC"
| 2017-02-18 || Win ||align=left| Bilal Loukili || Enfusion Live 46 || Eindhoven, Netherlands || Decision (Unanimous)  || 3 ||
|-
|-  bgcolor="#CCFFCC"
| 2016-10-30 || Win ||align=left| Robert Siebenheller  || King of the Ring IV: Final  || Arnhem, Netherlands || KO (Stoppage Time)  || 1 ||
|-
! style=background:white colspan=9 |
|-  bgcolor="#CCFFCC"
| 2016-10-30 || Win ||align=left| Marcel Verhaar  || King of the Ring IV: Semi Finals  || Arnhem, Netherlands || TKO (Surrender)  || 1 ||
|-
|-  bgcolor="#CCFFCC"
| 2016-10-30 || Win ||align=left| Nicky Lopez  || King of the Ring IV: Quarter Finals  || Arnhem, Netherlands || KO (Knee to the head)  || 1 ||
|-
|-  bgcolor="#CCFFCC"
| 2016-09-24 || Win ||align=left| William Diender  || Battle Events  || Arnhem, Netherlands || Decision (Unanimous)  || 4 ||
|-
|-  bgcolor="#CCFFCC"
| 2016-04-11 || Win ||align=left| Leroy Kaestner  || Battle Events  || Arnhem, Netherlands || TKO (Doctor stoppage)  || 1 ||
|-
|-  bgcolor="#CCFFCC"
| 2016-02-20 || Win ||align=left| Joey Huis  || Fighting Network Rings  || Mijdrecht, Netherlands || TKO (Doctor stoppage  || 5 ||
|-
| colspan=9 | Legend:

See also
List of male kickboxers

References

External links

1995 births
Living people
Dutch male kickboxers
Curaçao male kickboxers
Welterweight kickboxers
Dutch people of Curaçao descent
People from Willemstad